The 2003–04 Eastern Michigan Eagles men's basketball team represented Eastern Michigan University during the 2003–04 NCAA Division I men's basketball season. The Eagles, led by fourth year head coach Jim Boone. The Eagles played their home games at the Eastern Michigan University Convocation Center and were members of the West Division of the Mid-American Conference. They finished the season 13–15, 7–11 in MAC play. They finished fifth in the MAC West. They were knocked out in the first round of the MAC Tournament by Marshall.

Roster
Source:

The team captains were Markus Austin, Michael Ross.

Schedule

|-
!colspan=9| Regular Season

|-
!colspan=9| 2004 MAC men's basketball tournament

Awards
MAC Player of the Week
 Dec. 28,2003 John Bowler

Preseason 1st Team All-MAC West Division
John Bowler

E-Club Hall of Fame Inductees
Earl Dixon

Season Highlights

12/02 vs Kent State 
 EMU celebrated Grant Long Night with the retiring of his jersey number #43

12/23 vs Northern Colorado 
 JaQuan Hart sets a career high in points with 20. 
 John Bowler sets career high in points with 18. 
 The victory marks EMU head coach Jim Boone's 300th career victory.

01/03 at Bowling Green 
 EMU's John Bowler posted a career best 26 points.

01/17 vs Western Michigan 
 John Bowler posts fifth double-double of season.

02/07 vs Akron 
 Mid-American Conference Game of the Week televised by Fox Sports Net.
 Career high 25 points for Senior James Jackson.

References

Eastern Michigan Eagles men's basketball seasons
Eastern Michigan
2003 in sports in Michigan
2004 in sports in Michigan